Holt is a medieval market town and community in Wrexham County Borough, Wales. It is situated on the border with England and in the historic county of Denbighshire. Holt Castle was begun by Edward I shortly after the English invasion of Wales in 1277.
Farndon lies just over the River Dee.

Etymology 
The Old English word  meant a "wood" or "thicket" and is a common element in place names over the border in England.

Area
The district has been occupied since at least the Roman period.  A brickworks (possibly called Bovium) supplied clay tiles and pottery to the Roman fort of Deva Victrix, eight miles away (modern Chester). The works was located just downstream from the modern town. In the early 20th century, six kilns, a bath house, sheds and barracks were found there on the banks of the River Dee.

Three Bronze Age burial urns have also been found in Holt.

Town

There is a medieval market cross in the centre of Holt. The church of St Chad has parts dating to the 15th century and 17th century.

Medieval bridge

A Grade I listed 14th-century sandstone bridge links Holt with the English village of Farndon across the River Dee. Records from the county court of Chester in 1368, state that:
"the jury presented that John, earl of Warenne, late Lord of Bromfield, had constructed a bridge across the River Dee (during 1338)... and upon that bridge is a fortified gateway. The jury then claimed that illegal toll was being extorted from workmen daily crossing the bridge, and that the town of Holt was giving shelter to felons who ambushed Cheshire folk."
A survey of 1627 described the bridge: 
"contayninge 10 arches which River divideth Two Sheires, namely Cheshire and Denbye... Upon the fifth Arch from Holt standeth a Tower or Gatehouse of Fortification... [the text then describes the Lady's Chapel in the tower]... Upon the other end of the fortificacion next unto the manor of Farndon next unto the Manor of Farndon is layd out in Masons Works a Lyon to the full passant. And like Lyon is upon the gates of Holt Castell. The county of Chester doth repair the bridge to the Lyon."
Sixteen years later, William Brereton attacked the bridge for the Parliamentarians:
"for which end they had also made a towre and drawbridge and strong gates upon the bridge soe as they and wee coceived it difficult if not altogether ympossible to make way for our passage."
Despite this he, Thomas Myddelton and their forces took the bridge on 9 November 1643 when they cast 'some grenados amongst the Welshmen'.

Thomas Pennant recorded ten arches in 1754 (and had been told a datestone of 1354 was there until recently, which contradicts the more likely date of 1338) but Hubbard in Buildings of Wales only saw eight. The third arch, viewed from the Holt river bank, shows the strengthened arch where the drawbridge once stood.

Governance
An electoral ward in the same name exists. This ward stretches west to Abenbury and has a total population taken at the 2011 Census of 3,587.

People from Holt
 Leigh Richmond Roose, a Welsh footballer and international goalkeeper from Holt.
 H.G. Wells, the writer, was briefly teacher in a local private school, Holt Academy, in youth.

References

Further reading
Edward Hubbard, The Buildings of Wales: Clwyd (1986) 
Gordon Emery, Curious Clwyd 2 (1996)

External links

Holt Bridge
photos of Holt and surrounding area on geograph
 

Towns in Wrexham County Borough
Towns of the Welsh Marches